The 1985 European Formula 3000 Championship was the inaugural season of the Formula 3000 category. The European Formula 3000 Championship replaced Formula Two as the official feeder series to Formula One. It was scheduled over 12 rounds and contested over 11 rounds. 14 different teams tried their luck with 33 different drivers and 7 different chassis. The series was won by the German Christian Danner driving for BS Automotive.

Danner, who was laying second in the championship at the time, would graduate to Formula One when he made his Grand Prix debut for the German Zakspeed team at the 1985 Belgian Grand Prix at Spa-Francorchamps on 15 September, a week before he won the final round of the F3000 championship at Donington Park to clinch the title from Mike Thackwell.

Danner had the dubious honour of being the first in a long line of Formula 3000 champions who would fail to make an impact on Formula One, despite the championship being seen as the highest level FIA single-seater championship behind Grand Prix racing. Only future champions Jean Alesi, Olivier Panis and Juan Pablo Montoya would actually go on to win a Formula One Grand Prix.

Drivers and teams

Season review

Round 1: Silverstone, United Kingdom

At the start, the track was wet, and Emanuele Pirro took the lead from the second row, with pole sitter Michel Ferté dropping through the field. Alessandro Santin went off and out of the race at the first corner. At Maggots, Mike Thackwell took the lead from Pirro, and began to pull out a lead. By the end of the first lap, Christian Danner was up to second from sixth on the grid, with Ferté back into third place already. Pirro had fallen back to fourth, and Roberto Moreno was in fifth. At the Woodcote Chicane, Ferté got back past Danner into second place. Gabriele Tarquini spun exiting the Woodcote Chicane, but was miraculously avoided by everyone, and continued. On the drying track, Johnny Dumfries crashed, and Ferté took the lead back from Thackwell at the Woodcote Chicane. Not long after this, the heavens opened again, and Thackwell got back past Ferté while they both lapped Pirro. Moreno spun at the Woodcote Chicane, but quickly got back going again. Ferté also spun at the chicane, and badly damaged the front end of his car. John Nielsen got past Ferté's damaged car before Thackwell took his third Silverstone International Trophy victory, 32 seconds ahead of second placed Nielsen. Ferté finished third, Danner finished a lap down in fourth, and Tarquini and Moreno finished fifth and sixth respectively, despite them both spinning.

Round 2: Thruxton, United Kingdom

Gabriele Tarquini got the best start, going from fifth to first in one corner, but while going past Mike Thackwell, he clipped the front nose of the New Zealander's car, causing it to bend. Going into Campbell, Roberto Moreno slid off the track and out of the race. Johnny Dumfries harmlessly spun off at the next corner, Cobb, and he quickly rejoined the race. Michel Ferté took the lead from Thackwell into the Club Chicane, with Tomas Kaiser passing him on the pit straight afterwards. Thackwell pitted for a new front nosecone, and soon after, his teammate, John Nielsen pitted for a new nosecone himself. Ferté, who had started on wet tires, pitted for dry tires, as the track was almost completely dry. Kaiser then held a brief lead, before being overtaken by Emanuele Pirro. Then Thackwell, who had recovered most of the time he lost in the pit stop, overtook Ferté into Church. On the last lap, the back markers of Tarquini and Eric Lang were all that separated Pirro and Thackwell, but Lang had handling issues and slowed Thackwell down. After being overtaken, Lang promptly spun. Thackwell couldn't make up the lost time, and finished second to Pirro. Ferté finished third again, and Kaiser, Tarquini and Danner made up the rest of the points scorers.

Round 3: Estoril, Portugal

For the first time, Formula 3000 supported a round of Formula One. At the start, Thackwell got a good start, and Pirro nearly spun on the grass while trying to make up positions from tenth. After pulling out a big lead, Thackwell slowed because of electrical problems, leaving his teammate Nielsen to inherit the lead. Ferté and Tarquini fought for second place, while Nielsen pulled out a large lead. Pirro took fourth place from Moreno, and Nielsen took victory, with Ferté beating out Tarquini for second, with Pirro in fourth, Moreno in fifth, and Olivier Grouillard in sixth, taking his first point of the year.

Nurburgring, Germany

Round 4 was planned to take place at the still new Nurburgring GP Track, but heavy snow halted racing, and teams, fans, and drivers had to pack up and head to the next race.

Round 4: Vallelunga, Italy

At the start, Ferté took the lead from pole sitter Thackwell, with his teammate Nielsen up into third, and local hero Pirro settling into fourth. The front four stuck together like glue for most of the race, with Ferté keeping the door firmly shut to Thackwell. Nielsen overtook his teammate for second, but seemingly couldn't do anything about the Frenchman either. A collision between Ivan Capelli and Lamberto Leoni that launched Capelli into the air and heavily damaged his car, and damaged Leoni's rear wing. Pirro overtook Thackwell for third place, before quickly overtaking Nielsen for second. Then, while overtaking a back marker, Pirro made his move on Ferté, going three wide to make the overtake. Thackwell crashed out of the race when he had to avoid his teammate when he made a mistake. Ferté suffered an electrical fault that ended his race. Pirro won at his home race, with Nielsen second, Danner third, Grouillard in fourth, Philippe Streiff in fifth, and Dumfries sixth.

Round 5: Pau, France

Ferté overtook Thackwell for second at the start, while Pirro held onto the lead. Nielsen was fourth and Alain Ferté, older brother of Michel, dropped from third to fifth. Michel Ferté spun, and he took Thackwell out with him, sidelining the New Zealander. Ferté continued further down the field. Nielsen also went out of the race, and Danner in third was chasing down second placed Alain. Pirro started to slow because of overheating while Danner took second place. Danner made quick work of the Italian, and took the lead of the race. Alain Ferté retired with gearbox issues, while Danner held on to win the race, with Pirro holding onto second. Leoni was third, Grouillard fourth, Streiff in fifth, and Juan Manuel Fangio II in sixth, albeit 21 laps down.

Round 6: Spa-Francorchamps

The track at Spa-Francorchamps had been recently shortened from the 14 kilometer, mostly flat out original layout, to the shorter 7 kilometer version. The track had also been resurfaced, and it was very slippery. The two Ferté brothers were 1-2 at the start, with Michel ahead of Alain, and Pirro was in third place. Belgian Thierry Tassin was quickly up to sixth at his home race, passing Danner along the way. Streiff and Pirro fought hard over third and fourth, both ended up pushing too hard and retired with damaged cars. Michel Ferté was next to make a mistake, damaging his car too badly to continue. Tassan was next, being forced to retire from third. Alain Ferté was the most fortunate, as he spun and clipped the barrier, but was able to continue, even if he lost the lead to Thackwell. Nielsen took second from Alain, but nearly spun after. It wasn't too long until Nielsen's engine gave up on him, and Alain inherited second again. Thackwell won by 50 seconds to Alain, with Danner taking the final podium spot. Tarquini was fourth, Guido Daccò was fifth, and Fangio II finished sixth.

Championship standings
Scoring system

Points are awarded to the top 6 classified finishers.

Final point standings

Notes
Results in bold indicate pole position.
Results in italics indicate fastest lap.

References

International Formula 3000
International Formula 3000 seasons